The Miracle is a 1991 drama film written and directed by Neil Jordan. It stars Beverly D'Angelo, Donal McCann, and Niall Byrne. It was entered into the 41st Berlin International Film Festival.

Plot
Two teenage friends, Jimmy (Niall Byrne) and Rose (Lorraine Pilkington) live in the small seaside town of Bray, Ireland.  They spend their days wandering the streets and piers. To kill time, Rose and Jimmy make up stories about strangers on the street. One day, while watching people at the train station, a stylish older woman, Renee Baker (Beverly D'Angelo), stands out so imposingly from the dull townsfolk that Jimmy and Rose decide to follow her, infatuated with knowing everything about her. They pursue her to the beach and at last Renee speaks to them. When she looks at Jimmy, he's at once infatuated with this mystifying woman. Rose, who has feelings for Jimmy herself, decides to make him jealous by sleeping with a young lion tamer from a travelling circus (although she claims her real motivation was to set the animals free). Renee is eventually revealed to be Jimmy's mother, whom his father, Sam, had claimed was dead.

Cast
 Beverly D'Angelo as Renee Baker
 Donal McCann as Sam
 Niall Byrne as Jimmy
 Lorraine Pilkington as Rose
 J. G. Devlin as Mr. Beausang
 Cathleen Delany as Miss Strange
 Tom Hickey as Tommy
 Shane Connaughton as Rose's Father
 Mikkel Gaup as Jonner

Reception

Critical reception
The film got mixed reviews upon its release in 1991.  Critic Roger Ebert of the Chicago Sun-Times gave the film a two star rating out of four saying, "Strange, how a movie of such delicate romantic sensibilities could go astray because of a heavy-handed plot." On Rotten Tomatoes the film  has a 63% rating , based on reviews from 8 critics.

Box office
The Miracle was released on 3 July 1991 in the United States and made $12,076 in its opening weekend. The film made a mere $835,519 all together when it ended its run on 10 October 1991 with its widest release being in 41 theatres.

Availability
After the film's theatrical run, the film was released on videocassette in January 1992 by Live Home Video and around the same time in Canada by Cineplex Odeon and MCA.

References

External links
 
 

1991 films
1991 drama films
Irish drama films
English-language Irish films
1990s English-language films
Films directed by Neil Jordan
Incest in film
British drama films
Films scored by Anne Dudley
1990s British films